A shrine is a holy or sacred place.

Shrine(s) or The Shrine may also refer to:

Places and structures

Catholicism
List of shrines
Shrine Catholic High School  Royal Oak, Michigan
Martyrs' Shrine, Roman Catholic church in Midland, Ontario, Canada
Shrine of Our Lady of Guadalupe, La Crosse, Wisconsin
Shrine of the Sacred Heart, Mount Pleasant / Columbia Heights
National shrine a Catholic church or other sacred place
Shrines to the Virgin Mary
Note: The term "shrine" is sometimes used incorrectly as a literal translation of the German word "Schrein", meaning chest (in general) but more often used for a reliquary chest or casket. Compare Schrein and Reliquienschrein on German Wikipedia.

War memorials
Shrine of Remembrance in Melbourne, Australia
Shrine of Remembrance, Brisbane, Australia

Other
Shinto shrine, a "Jinja"
Shrine Auditorium, an event venue in Los Angeles, California, U.S.

Arts and entertainment

Film and television
The Shrine (film), a 2010 Canadian horror film
The Shrine (Stargate Atlantis), a television episode

Literature
Shrine (novel), a 1983 novel by James Herbert

Music
Shrines (Armand Hammer album), 2020
Shrines (Purity Ring album), 2012
"Shrine", a song by the Dambuilders, 1992
"Shrines", a song by Paradise Lost from Medusa, 2017
"The Shrine", a song by Ava Inferi from Burdens, 2006
"The Shrine/An Argument", a song by Fleet Foxes from Helplessness Blues, 2011

See also